In the United Kingdom, the term hunting with no qualification generally refers to hunting with hounds, e.g. normally fox hunting, stag (deer) hunting, beagling, or minkhunting, whereas shooting is the shooting of game birds. What is called deer hunting elsewhere is deer stalking. According to the British Association for Shooting and Conservation (BASC) over a million people a year participate in shooting, including stalking, shooting, hunting, clay shooting and target shooting. Firearm ownership is regulated in the UK by licensing. Provisions exist for those without a Firearm or Shotgun certificate to shoot under the supervision of a certificate holder.

History
Hunting has been practised by humans in  Britain since prehistoric times; it was a crucial activity of hunter-gatherer societies before the domestication of animals and the dawn of agriculture.

During the last ice age, humans and neanderthals hunted mammoths and woolly rhinoceroses by driving them over cliffs; evidence has been found at La Cotte de St Brelade on the island of Jersey.

In Britain, hunting with hounds was popular in Celtic Britain before the Romans arrived, using the Agassaei breed. The Romans brought their Castorian and Fulpine hound breeds
to England, along with importing the brown hare (the mountain hare is native) and fallow deer as quarry. Wild boar was also hunted.

The earliest known attempt to specifically hunt a fox with hounds occurred in Norfolk, in the East of England, in 1534, where farmers began chasing down foxes with their dogs as a form of pest control. Packs of hounds were first trained specifically to hunt foxes in the late 17th century, with the oldest such fox-hunt likely to be the Bilsdale in Yorkshire. By the end of the 17th century, many organised packs were hunting both hare and fox.

Shotguns were improved during the 18th and 19th centuries and game shooting became more popular. To protect the  pheasants for the shooters,  gamekeepers culled competitive species such as foxes, magpies and birds of prey almost to extirpation in popular areas, and landowners improved their s and other habitats for game. Game Laws were relaxed by Parliament in 1831, which meant anyone could obtain a permit to shoot rabbits, hares, and gamebirds, although shooting and taking away any birds or animals on someone else's land without their permission continued to count as the crime of poaching, and continues to do so today.

Hunting was formerly a royal sport, and to an extent shooting still is, with many kings and queens being involved in hunting and shooting, including King Edward VII, King George V (who on 18 December 1913 shot over a thousand pheasants out of a total bag of 3937), King George VI and Prince Philip, although Queen Elizabeth II did not shoot. Shooting on the large estates of Scotland has always been a fashionable country sport. This trend is generally attributed to the Victorians, who were inspired by the romantic nature of the Scottish Highlands.

 game shooting and deer stalking are carried on as field sports in Great Britain and Northern Ireland. Hunting with hounds in the traditional manner became unlawful in Scotland in 2002 and in England and Wales in 2005, but continues in certain accepted forms. Traditional foxhunting continues in Northern Ireland. Following a trail (similar to drag hunting) rather than a live quarry has subsequently grown in importance in Great Britain, as has hunting foxes with a bird of prey. In 2005 it became unlawful in England and Wales to shoot game birds while they are not in flight, an action which has long been considered  unsporting.

Forms of hunting and shooting

Equipment

Since the mid-18th century game keepers and hunters kept gamebooks for recording game and vermin killed on country estates, farms, etc.

Shooting

The shooting of game birds, in particular pheasant, is found in the UK, on large, traditional driven shoots on estates and on small-scale rough shoots. Shooting of game birds is carried out using a shotgun, most often 12 and 20 gauge or a .410 bore, often on land managed by a gamekeeper.  Shooters are often referred to as "guns".

Game birds are shot in different ways. In driven game shooting, where beaters are employed to walk through woods and over moors or fields, dependent on the quarry and time of year and drive game towards a line of 8–10 standing guns standing about 50 or 60 metres apart. The guns will be members of a syndicate sharing costs, or have paid in the region of £25+ per bird for pheasants and much more for grouse. The total bag (number of birds shot) will be anywhere between 10 and 400, again dependent on the budget and quarry. The day may be very formal, and the head gamekeeper or a shoot captain will oversee proceedings. Great emphasis is placed on safety. Pickers-up with dogs are also employed to make sure all shot or wounded game is collected. On such estates, large numbers of pheasants, partridge and duck, but not grouse, are reared and released to provide sufficient numbers of game. Grouse cannot be reared intensively but the heather moorland where they live is intensively managed to maximise numbers.

Rough shooting, where several guns walk through a woodland, moor or field and shoot the birds their dogs put up, is increasingly popular. It is less formal and may be funded by several people grouping together to form a "syndicate", paying a certain amount each year towards pheasants, habitat maintenance, etc.

Wildfowling is typically happens in the form of a single gun sitting in pursuit of wildfowl by a body of water, or on the coastal foreshore, often at dawn or dusk, and waits for birds to "flight" in. This is sometimes undertaken in total darkness or by the light of the moon. Duck are also shot by the two methods described above.

Rook shooting was once popular in rural Britain for both pest control and gaining food, wherein juvenile rooks living in rookeries, known as "branchers", were shot before they were able to fly. These events were both very social and a source of food (the rook becomes inedible once mature) as the rook and rabbit pie was considered a great delicacy.

Deer stalking

High-powered rifles are used for deer stalking.  This may take place high on moors, or from a "high seat" in woodland.  Venison is also a highly popular meat with sales quadrupling in the UK in 2014.

Game animals
In the UK "game" is defined in law by the Game Act 1831. Other (non-game) birds that are hunted for food in the UK are specified under the Wildlife and Countryside Act 1981. UK law defines game as including:

Although there is no close season for hare outside Northern Ireland, the Hare Preservation Act of 1892 makes it illegal to sell, or offer to sell, hare between 1 March and 31 July. 
Deer are not included in the definition, but similar controls provided to those in the Game Act apply to deer (from the Deer Act 1991). Deer hunted in the UK are:

 Red deer
 Roe deer
 Fallow deer
 Sika deer
 Muntjac deer
 Chinese water deer
 Hybrids of these deer

Other birds and mammals shot in the UK include:

Ducks
 Mallard
 Wigeon
 Teal
 Shoveler
 Pintail
 Common pochard
 Common goldeneye
 Gadwall
 Tufted duck
Geese
 Greylag goose
 Canada goose
 Pink-footed goose
Other birds
 Wood pigeon
 Woodcock
 Snipe
 Golden plover
Mammals
 European rabbit

Other
The aforementioned species are those primarily pursued for game shooting. To this list can be added feral pigeon, jay, magpie, carrion crow, jackdaw and rook, which can be shot for the sole purposes of conservation, public health or safety or to prevent serious damage.

Black grouse are no longer shot regularly, due to a continuing decline in numbers and those that are shot are most likely to be females mistaken for red grouse.

Capercaillie are no longer shot in the UK, as they are now protected (Scotland only) due to a long-term decline in population.

Eurasian coot and moorhen are also shot, but not as much as in the past; they have a closed season that follows the wildfowl season and are classed as game.

Field sports and conservation

Habitat destruction and fragmentation are major drivers of biodiversity loss in the United Kingdom, however landowners that participate in field sports, particularly hunting and shooting, are more likely to conserve and reinstate woodlands and hedgerows because they are used by quarry species. A study in 2003 showed that they are around 2.5 times more likely to plant new woodlands than landowners without game or hunting interests, and also conserve a far greater woodland area. These habitats are essential for the persistence of a wide range of other British wildlife, and consequently it has been suggested that field sports can provide valuable tools for wildlife conservation in the UK, without the need for governmental subsidies or protective legislation.

Landowners undertake management measures to improve habitats for quarry species, including shrub planting, coppicing and skylighting to encourage understory growth. Roger Draycott of the Game and Wildlife Conservation Trust has reported the conservation benefits of game management schemes in the UK, including woodlands with denser undergrowth and higher abundances of native birds. However, overall evidence that game shooting is beneficial to wider biodiversity has been inconclusive: high densities of game birds are known to negatively impact ecosystems, resulting in shorter grassland vegetation, lower floral diversity in semi-natural woodlands, fewer saplings in hedgerows leading from such woodlands, and possible reductions in arthropod biomass attributable to predation.

The rearing of both wild and released game birds requires the provision of food and shelter during the winter months, and to achieve this landowners plant cover crops. Generally species such as maize or quinoa, these are planted in strips alongside arable land. Cover crops are also utilised by a variety of nationally declining farmland birds such as linnets and finches, providing valuable food resources and refuge from predators. One study assessed the response of bird assemblages to the implementation of a multi-dimensional game management system on a farm in Leicestershire, England. It was found that the populations of several declining species increased significantly, suggesting that game management strategies may indeed play a major role in the conservation of wildlife in Britain, particularly threatened farmland passerines.

Prior to the Hunting Act, fox hunting also provided a major incentive for woodland conservation and management throughout England and Wales, with higher species diversity and abundance of plants and butterflies found in woodlands managed for foxes according to a survey of mounted hunts in 2006, verified by The Council of Hunting Associations.

Hunting lodge

A hunting lodge is a small country property specifically used for organising hunting parties. It can also be called a hunting box, shooting box or shooting lodge.

Such places might be quite separate or detached from the main property, or in a different part of the country.

The lodge may have a special room for hanging game and a gun room where guns were lodged and ammunition stored.

Queen Elizabeth's Hunting Lodge, formerly known as The Great Standing, is located in Epping Forest. It is an example of such a Tudor installation.

See also
 Game & Wildlife Conservation Trust
 List of renewable resources produced and traded by the United Kingdom

References

External links

The Science and Sociology of Hunting: Shifting Practices and Perceptions in the United States and Great Britain from The State of the Animals II: 2003 
 British Association for Shooting and Conservation website